Larkfield & New Hythe Wanderers Football Club is a football club based in New Hythe, England.

History
Larkfield & New Hythe Wanderers were founded in 1961 and Larkfield Boys were formed in 1976 as a youth football club. In 1998 the senior team entered the Kent County League. During the club's tenure in the Kent County League, the club won promotion to the Division One West and East on two occasions, in 2007 and 2009 respectively. In 2021, the club was admitted into the Southern Counties East League Division One. Larkfield & New Hythe entered the FA Vase for the first time in 2021–22.

Ground
The club currently play at Larkfield & New Hythe Sports Club in New Hythe.

References

Association football clubs established in 1976
1976 establishments in England
Football clubs in England
Football clubs in Kent
Kent County League
Southern Counties East Football League